You Hee-yeol's Sketchbook  is a South Korean talk show and live music television program airing from April 24, 2009, until July 22, 2022. It was hosted by You Hee-yeol, also known as his one-man band, Toy. The program has aired since April 24, 2009.

On July 18, 2022, it was announced the show would end after 13 years, with the final episode being filmed the following day.

Format 
You Hee-yeol's Sketchbook aired on KBS2 every Friday at 11:20pm KST and has a running time of about 80 minutes. Each week, musicians (usually 3–4) appear as guests to perform and talk with the MC You Hee-yeol for 10–15 minutes.

Airtime

List of episodes

2009

2010

2011

2012

2013

2014

2015

2016

2017

2018

2019

2020

2021

2022

Ratings

2016

2017

2018

2019

2020

References

External links 
  
 

2000s South Korean television series
2010s South Korean television series
2020s South Korean television series
Korean Broadcasting System original programming
Korean-language television shows
K-pop television series
South Korean music television shows
South Korean variety television shows
2009 South Korean television series debuts
2022 South Korean television series endings